The nasofrontal vein is a vein in the orbit around the eye. It drains into the superior ophthalmic vein. It can be used for endovascular access to the cavernous sinus.

Structure 
The nasofrontal vein drains into the superior ophthalmic vein.

Clinical significance 
The nasofrontal vein can be used to access the superior ophthalmic vein and the cavernous sinus with endovascular tools.

References

External links 

Veins of the head and neck